Penwood is a village in the civil parish of Highclere in the Basingstoke and Deane district of Hampshire, England. Its nearest town is Newbury, which lies approximately 4.1 miles (6.4 km) north-east from the village.
Penwood has three main housing estates: Penwood Heights, Woodlands and Heathlands. There is a small shop in the village.

Villages in Hampshire